is a railway station in the city of Nishio, Aichi, Japan, operated by Meitetsu.

Lines

Station layout
The station has two pairs of opposed side platforms. Each pair is set at an angle to each other, forming a "V" shape. Platform one is not in use. The station has automated ticket machines, Manaca automated turnstiles and is attended.

Platforms

Adjacent stations

Station history
The station was renamed to its present name on November 1, 1960.

Passenger statistics
In fiscal 2017, the station was used by an average of 1452 passengers daily (boarding passengers only).

Surrounding area
former Kira Town Hall
Yoshida Elementary School

See also
 List of Railway Stations in Japan

References

External links

 Official web page 

Railway stations in Japan opened in 1928
Railway stations in Aichi Prefecture
Stations of Nagoya Railroad
Nishio, Aichi